Gizmel or Gizmal, also rendered as Gazmel or Gezmel or Gezmil or Gizmil or Kizmel, may refer to:
 Gizmel-e Olya
 Gizmel-e Sofla